George Kottan (born 6 October 1946 in Budapest) is a Hungarian-Austrian football manager and former footballer.

Playing career
Kottan played as a midfielder and started his career at MTK. His first match in the first league was at 5 April 1970. He left in 1972 to play in the Austrian National League for SK VÖEST Linz where they won the title in 1974, becoming the first team from Linz to become Austrian champions.

He then transferred to KFC Uerdingen 05 of the German Bundesliga in 1976 before winding up his playing career in 1979 in the US for the Los Angeles Aztecs in the North American Soccer League, playing for them for one season as a player-coach under Rinus Michels.

Management career
The following season Kottan became Rinus Michels assistant at the Aztecs. After a break, he rejoined Michels at German club 1. FC Köln where they won the DFB-Pokal. In 1984 Kottan left to take charge of his first club in Austria, with Ch. Linz and stayed until 1987 when he left to become a coach under Antal Dunai first for Real Murcia and then moved with him in 1990 to Levante UD.

Then in 1993, he worked with Dunai for the Hungarian Olympic football team, reaching the 1996 Olympic games. Kottan remained as a technical director until 2000 when he had the opportunity to manage Bangladesh, taking them to victory in the 2003 South Asian Football Federation Gold Cup.

He also has managed Muktijoddha Sangsad KS of the Bangladesh Professional Football League and in the process won the Bangladesh Federation Cup. Later, Kottan took control of Indian National Football League club Churchill Brothers SC in 2005.

Kottan became the Pakistan national football team head coach on 20 February 2009. However, just one year later his contract wasn't renewed after mixed results. Then he joined Abahani Limited Dhaka, in 2015. In 2016, Kottán lead Abahani to the 2016 Bangladesh Football Premier League trophy as unbeaten champions.

Other work
Kottan has also worked on FIFA's Goal Project in Berlin, Germany and has a degree from the German Sport University Cologne.

He holds a UEFA Pro Licence.

Honours

Player
With SK VOEST Linz
Austrian Bundesliga Champions 1974

Manager
With Bangladesh national football team
 SAFF Cup Champions 2003

With Muktijoddha Sangsad KS
Bangladesh Federation Cup Winners 2003
Bangladesh Premier League champions 2016 and 2016 Bangladesh Federation Cup With Dhaka Abahani

References

External links
Kottan new Pakistan boss

Kottan's NASL stats
Georg Kottan Interview at kfc-uerdingen.de 

1946 births
Living people
Hungarian footballers
Austrian footballers
Austrian people of Hungarian descent
Austrian football managers
LASK players
MTK Budapest FC players
North American Soccer League (1968–1984) players
Los Angeles Aztecs players
KFC Uerdingen 05 players
Pakistan national football team managers
Expatriate football managers in Pakistan
Expatriate football managers in Bangladesh
Bangladesh national football team managers
Abahani Limited Dhaka managers
Footballers from Budapest
Austrian expatriate sportspeople in Pakistan
Association football midfielders